Perigua, Arizona is an historical which might refer to one of two populated places in Arizona:

 Hickiwan, located in Pima County
 Tatai Toak, located in Pima County